The 1987 Brasil Open was a women's tennis tournament played on outdoor clay courts in Guarujá in Brazil and was part of the Category 1 tier of the 1988 WTA Tour. The tournament ran from 7 December through 13 December 1987. Neige Dias won the singles title.

Finals

Singles

 Neige Dias defeated  Patricia Medrado 6–0, 6–7(2–7), 6–4
 It was Dias' only title of the year and the 2nd of her career.

Doubles

 Katrina Adams /  Cheryl Jones defeated  Jill Hetherington /  Mercedes Paz 6–4, 4–6, 6–4
 It was Adams' only title of the year and the 1st of her career. It was Jones' only title of the year and the 1st of her career.

References

External links
 Women's Tennis Association (WTA) tournament edition details
 International Tennis Federation (ITF) tournament edition details

Brasil Open
1987 Brasil Open
1987 in Brazilian tennis